Wishaya Trongcharoenchaikul (born 8 April 1995) is a Thai tennis player.

Trongcharoenchaikul has a career high ATP singles ranking of 426 achieved on 14 May 2018. He also has a career high doubles ranking of 450 achieved on 14 August 2017. Trongcharoenchaikul has won 1 ATP Challenger doubles title at the 2016 Wind Energy Holding Bangkok Open.

Tour titles

Doubles

External links
 
 
 

1995 births
Living people
Wishaya Trongcharoenchaikul
Wishaya Trongcharoenchaikul
Wishaya Trongcharoenchaikul
Southeast Asian Games medalists in tennis
Tennis players at the 2018 Asian Games
Competitors at the 2017 Southeast Asian Games
Wishaya Trongcharoenchaikul
Wishaya Trongcharoenchaikul